Gilbert Basset was  Archdeacon of Totnes during 1206.

References

Archdeacons of Totnes